Albert Ronald da Silva Meyer (born 1941) is Hitachi America Professor emeritus of computer science at Massachusetts Institute of Technology (MIT).

Biography
Meyer received his PhD from Harvard University in 1972 in applied mathematics, under the supervision of Patrick C. Fischer. He joined the Department of Electrical Engineering and Computer Science (EECS) faculty at MIT in 1969. Meyer became the Hitachi America Professor of Computer Science and Engineering in 1991. He retired from MIT in 2016.

Academic life

Meyer's seminal works include , which introduced the polynomial hierarchy. He has supervised numerous PhD students who are now famous computer scientists; these include Nancy Lynch, Leonid Levin, Jeanne Ferrante, Charles Rackoff, Larry Stockmeyer, David Harel, Joseph Halpern, and John C. Mitchell.  He was the editor-in-chief of the international computer science journal Information and Computation from 1981 until 2020.

Awards
He has been a Fellow of the American Academy of Arts and Sciences (AAAS) since 1987, and he was inducted as a Fellow of the Association for Computing Machinery (ACM) in 2000.

Personal life
He is married to the computer scientist Irene Greif.

Publications
 1991. Research Directions in Computer Science: An MIT Perspective. (Ed. with John Guttag, Ronald Rivest, and Peter Szolovits) MIT Press.
 .

References

External links

Meyer, Albert R. at MathSciNet

Albert Meyer papers, MC-0377. Massachusetts Institute of Technology, Department of Distinctive Collections, Cambridge, Massachusetts. 

1941 births
Living people
Theoretical computer scientists
Fellows of the Association for Computing Machinery
Fellows of the American Academy of Arts and Sciences
MIT School of Engineering faculty
Harvard University alumni